Off Limits is an American reality television series that premiered on May 16, 2011, on the Travel Channel. The series features "untold stories and secrets" of America's most iconic cities as host Don Wildman ventures and sometimes trespasses through unexplored areas where not many people have dared to go before. First season episodes aired every Monday at 9 PM EST.

The second season premiered on Tuesday April 17, 2012 at 10 PM EST. For the remainder of the season, one episode aired on a Thursday at 8 PM EST while the last few episodes were burned off on Sundays at 9 AM EST.

The third season premiered on Tuesday June 4, 2013 at 10 PM EST.

Synopsis
Adventure seeker and series host Don Wildman travels across America ignoring the warning signs to explore dangerous "off-limit" areas in major cities throughout the United States – cities that may just be a tourist destination for ordinary travelers, but for Wildman and his crew of urban spelunkers, are like embarking on a journey to rediscover a city's past by uncovering its secret history.

In the introduction, Wildman states:

Season 2 introduction, Wildman says:

Episodes

Season 1 (2011)

Season 2 (2012)

Season 3 (2013)

References

External links
 
 Authentic Entertainment's Official Site
 
 

2011 American television series debuts
2010s American documentary television series
2013 American television series endings
Travel Channel original programming
Television shows set in Pittsburgh
Television series by Authentic Entertainment